Daniele Pagani (born 11 June 1966) is a retired Italian high jumper. He won a medal, at senior level, at the International athletics competitions.

Biography
He won the bronze medal at the 1987 Mediterranean Games, finished seventh at the 1988 European Indoor Championships and twelfth at the 1990 European Championships. He became Italian high jump champion in 1987 and 1990, rivalling with Luca Toso and Marcello Benvenuti. He also became indoor champion in 1988.

His personal best jump is 2.28 metres, achieved in the qualifying round of the 1990 European Championships in Split.

National titles
Daniele Pagani has won 3 times the individual national championship.
1 win in high jump (1988)
2 wins in high jump indoor (1987, 1990)

See also
 High jump winners of Italian Athletics Championships

References

External links
 
Daniele Pagani 2.28 at Youjump.eu

1966 births
Living people
Italian male high jumpers
Mediterranean Games bronze medalists for Italy
Athletes (track and field) at the 1987 Mediterranean Games
Mediterranean Games medalists in athletics